The 1993–94 season was the third season of the Serbian Hockey League. Only three teams participated, each one playing four games with one another, resulting in 8 games for each team. HK Partizan won all the games that it played that season, resulting in them winning the regular division and the playoffs. It was their first title since the end of the former Yugoslavia.

Teams
HK Partizan
KHK Crvena Zvezda
HK Spartak Subotica

Final standings

Games
The list is incomplete, including only half the games played.
Partizan-Crvena Zvezda 7–3
Partizan-Spartak 17–4
Partizan-Crvena Zvezda 6–2
Partizan-Spartak 18–2
Partizan-Crvena Zvezda 5–0
Partizan-Spartak 22–1
Partizan-Crvena Zvezda 9–4
Partizan-Spartak 15–3

Playoffs

Semifinals
Crvena Zvezda defeated Spartak

Finals
Partizan-Crvena Zvezda 3–1
Partizan-Crvena Zvezda 8–3
Partizan-Crvena Zvezda 2–1

External links
 Sezona 1993/94

Serbian Hockey League
Serbian Hockey League seasons
Serb